The Right to Love is a 1930 American pre-Code drama film which was nominated at the 4th Academy Awards for Best Cinematography (for Charles Lang). It was based on Susan Glaspell's 1928 novel Brook Evans.

Premise
A woman learns she is illegitimate.

Cast
Ruth Chatterton as Brooks Evans/Naomi Kellogg  
Paul Lukas as Eric
David Manners as Joe Copeland 
Irving Pichel as Caleb Evans
Louise Mackintosh as Mrs. Copeland
Oscar Apfel as William Kellogg
Veda Buckland as Mrs. Kellogg
Robert Parrish as Willie
Lillian West as Martha
George C. Pearce as Dr. Scudder (credited as George Pearce)

References

External links
 

 

1930 drama films
1930 films
American black-and-white films
American drama films
Films directed by Richard Wallace
Paramount Pictures films
Films based on American novels
American feminist films
Films scored by Karl Hajos
1930s English-language films
1930s American films